Kristie Boogert  (born 16 December 1973) is a former professional female tennis player from the Netherlands who retired in 2003 due to chronic elbow pain. On 5 February 1996 she reached her career-high singles ranking of number 29.

She has not won any singles titles, but did win three titles in doubles. At the 1994 French Open championships she won the mixed doubles title with countryman Menno Oosting.

Her biggest achievement came during the 2000 Summer Olympics in Sydney where she won the silver medal in doubles, partnering Miriam Oremans. They were beaten by Venus and Serena Williams in the final.

Major finals

Olympic finals

Doubles: 1 (0–1)

WTA finals

Singles 1

Doubles 10 (3–7)

Mixed doubles 1

ITF Finals

Singles Finals: (2–1)

Doubles Finals: (4–2)

External links
 
 
 

1973 births
Living people
Dutch female tennis players
French Open champions
Olympic silver medalists for the Netherlands
Olympic tennis players of the Netherlands
People from Oud-Beijerland
Tennis players at the 2000 Summer Olympics
Olympic medalists in tennis
Grand Slam (tennis) champions in mixed doubles
Tennis commentators
Medalists at the 2000 Summer Olympics
Sportspeople from South Holland